Qana, also spelled Cana or Kana,  is a town in southern Lebanon located  southeast of the city of Tyre and  north of the border with Israel, in an area historically known as Upper Galilee.

The 10,000 residents of Qana are primarily Shia although there is also a Melkite (Greek Catholic) Christian community in the village.

Biblical controversy 

In the Gospel of John, Jesus is said to have performed his first miracle of turning water into wine at Cana in Galilee. Some Christians, especially Lebanese Christians, believe Qana to have been the actual location of this event. Eusebius of the 4th century share this view in his Onomasticon.

In 1994, Nabih Berri, Lebanon's Parliament Speaker and leader of the secular Shia Amal Movement, wanted to establish a Christian shrine at a cave in Qana to attract tourists and pilgrims. The government sent a 100-man company of troops to Qana to prevent potential religious conflict. This proposal was revived in 1999.

History

There are many ancient ruins around the village.

In 1596, it was named as a village, Qana, in the Ottoman nahiya (subdistrict) of Tibnin  under the liwa' (district) of Safad, with a population of 47 households and five bachelors, all Muslim. The villagers paid a taxes on agricultural products, such as goats and beehives, in addition to "occasional revenues", a press for olive oil or grape syrup, and a fixed sum; a total of 3,916 akçe.

In 1875 Victor Guérin visited: "This great village, the population of which is at least a thousand, is divided into three quartiers. The highest, called Kana el Foka, occupies the summit of the hill. It is considered the most ancient of the three. It is now entirely abandoned, except by about thirty Metawileh, and the stones of its overthrown houses are continually being removed to build new houses in the two other quarters. In the second quarter are about 600 Metawileh in the third, 400 United Greeks.'

In 1881, the PEF's Survey of Western Palestine (SWP)  described it: "A large village of well-built houses, whose inhabitants are partly Christians, partly Moslems. There are about 400 Christians to 500 Moslems. The ground is cultivated, and planted with olives and figs. The village is divided into two parts, with a birket between. There is a Christian church. It is situated on high ground, and is well supplied with water from the two springs, 'Ain el Gharbiyeh and 'Ain el Kussis.

Modern era

Qana is known internationally for two separate incidents in which the Israeli Defense Forces  caused civilian deaths during military operations in Lebanon.

 1996 shelling of Qana: On 18 April 1996, amid heavy fighting between the Israel Defense Forces and Hezbollah fighters during Operation Grapes of Wrath, a Fijian UNIFIL compound in the village was shelled by Israeli artillery, killing 106 civilians and injuring around 116 others who had taken refuge there to escape the fighting. Four UNIFIL soldiers were also seriously injured.

 2006 Qana airstrike: On 30 July 2006, during the 2006 Israel-Lebanon conflict, Israeli airstrikes hit an apartment building. The Lebanese Red Cross originally stated that at least 56 people were killed, 32 of whom were children. Human Rights Watch later announced that at least 22 people escaped the basement, and 28 were confirmed dead, of whom 16 were children, with 13 more than still missing.

After both attacks the residents of Qana built memorials to commemorate the deaths.

Location
Qana is located in the Tyre District within the Governorate (Mohafaza) of South Lebanon. Surrounding villages include Hanaway, Deir Kanoun, Rmadiyyeh, Deir Amess and Siddikine.

Residents

In 2007, the registered population was an estimated 7,700 (based on the number of voters in the year 2000 that reached around 4,940). The resident population did then not exceed 3,800 and the number of households was estimated at 620. In terms of confession, Shiites constituted 95% of Qana's resident population, but the registered population was distributed as follows:

Shiite: 83%
 Melkite Greek Catholics: 13%
Maronite Catholics: 3%
 Other confessions: 1%

According, to the Paris-based Centre de ressources sur le développement local au Liban, one can count approximately 100 families in Qana, with the largest, based on the number of voters, being the following: Attieh (580 voters), Borji (200 voters), Chalhoub (196 voters), Abdel Rida (186 voters), Sa’egh (184 voters), Jaber (158 voters), Zaarour (134 voters), Hammoud (130 voters), Dakhlallah (124 voters), Haidar (116 voters), Adib (104 voters), Salami (103 voters), Farnoune (78 voters), Madi (71 voters), Hodroj (69 voters), Haddad (152 voters), Boutros (77 voters), Shami (72 voters), Hajj (66 voters), and Abdelhussein (21 voters).

Local authorities
The local administration in Qana is headed by a Municipal Council composed of 15 members and headed by Dr. Salah Salami. In addition, the town has four mayors: Afif Haddad, Ali Ismail, Ali Attieh and Kemel Farnoune.

Educational sector
There are two public schools in Qana (Qana Public High School with around 600 students and the Public Intermediate School of Qana that has approximately 550 students), and two private schools (Jabal Amel Typical school which is subsidized and numbers 370 students and Jabal Amel High School with 142 students).

Service and trade institutions
The number of service and trade institutions in the town are estimated to be in the region of 263, dealing mainly in the fabric trade and clothing (26), food products (51), restaurants (7), barber shops (9), household items (14), bakeries and butcheries (12), pharmacies (4), smithery and mechanics (19), sawmills and galleries (13), gas stations (4), smithery and aluminum (11), libraries (4).

Agricultural sector
The municipality of Qana owns approximately 23% of the town's total area. Agricultural land constitutes 37% of the terrain and land ownership is distributed among approximately 220 families i.e. the town's real estate is owned by 22% of the families in the town.

Olive cultivation consumes around 65% of agricultural land, with 15% for grains and 20% for tobacco. In addition, 62 people are employed in the agriculture sector, which is approximately 7% of the labor force.

Clubs and associations
There are seven associations in the village of Qana distributed as follows: Qana sports club, Qana's agricultural cooperative, Association of Qana El Jalil, El Jalil club (non-active), as well as the family associations of the Attieh, Hammoud and Zaarour families.

Historic sites
There are natural, rock-dug caves to be found in Qana that carry old inscriptions. It is said that Jesus Christ’s first miracle took place at a wedding ceremony (the Wedding at Cana) in one of these caves.  The tomb of King Hiram of Tyre can be found at the outskirts of the town and in the neighbouring village of Hanaway.

There are also two mosques in Qana, as well as the Saint Joseph Church for Catholics.

Characteristics
Qana can be characterized by the high emigration rates it has seen, dating back to the 1920s. Increasing progressively, the current number of those who have emigrated has reached 2,500 people, which is equivalent to 32% of the registered population.

Main destinations for Qana residents include the Côte d'Ivoire (46%), Senegal (15%), Saudi Arabia (6%), the United States (6%), Zaïre (5%) as well as other countries (Sierra Leone, Kuwait, Liberia, Nigeria, France and the UK).

Finally, Qana’s name has become synonymous with the deaths of 100 of its residents under the Israeli ‘Grapes of Wrath’ bombardment in April 1996.

References

Bibliography

External links
Survey of Western Palestine, Map 1: IAA, Wikimedia commons
Qana, Localiban

Israeli–Lebanese conflict
Populated places in the Israeli security zone 1985–2000
Maronite Christian communities in Lebanon
Melkite Christian communities in Lebanon
Populated places in Tyre District
Shia Muslim communities in Lebanon